Rosane Reis Santos (born 20 June 1987) is a Brazilian weightlifter. She competed in the women's 53 kg event at the 2016 Summer Olympics.

In 2019, she competed in the women's 55 kg event at the 2019 World Weightlifting Championships held in Pattaya, Thailand.

References

External links
 

1987 births
Living people
Brazilian female weightlifters
Olympic weightlifters of Brazil
Weightlifters at the 2016 Summer Olympics
Place of birth missing (living people)
Weightlifters at the 2015 Pan American Games
Pan American Games competitors for Brazil
21st-century Brazilian women